The African School of Economics (ASE) is a private university headquartered in Abomey-Calavi (near Cotonou), Republic of Benin.

It is the expansion of the Institute for Empirical Research in Political Economy (IERPE, IREEP in French), founded in 2004, into a full-fledged pan-African university. Faculty members come from top universities in the US, Canada and Europe. Currently (2016) it offers four graduate programs at master's level: Master in Mathematics, Economics and Statistics (MMES), Master in Business Administration (MBA), Master in Public Administration (MPA) and Master in Development Economics (MDE). ASE also offers a PhD program in Economics and two Certificate Programs, Impact Evaluation and Quantitative Finance.

History
The school is a continuation of the success of the Institute of Empirical Research in Political Economy (IERPE) founded by Leonard Wantchekon in 2004 in Cotonou, Benin. A nonprofit training and research initiative in Political Economy and Applied Statistics, IERPE provides expertise in public policy and trains executives for the public and private sector in West Africa. The opening ceremony took place on August 29, 2014.

Since its inception, the Institute expanded its activities to include a successful Masters of Public Economics and Applied Statistics (MEPSA). The MEPSA has had 74 African graduates, all of whom are in high demand in the West African region:  more than 75% of the graduates of the classes of 2006-2009 are employed in research centers throughout West Africa, in the World Bank and in different governments. The MEPSA program is accredited by the Ministry of Education in Benin.

ASE aims to meet the urgent need for an academic institution capable of generating the necessary human capital in Africa. Although the region has seen significant improvements in primary and secondary education in the past few decades there is still a pressing need for advanced education centers.  Through its PhD programs, ASE hopes to provide the missing African voice in many Africa-related academic debates. Furthermore, through the Master in Business Administration (MBA), Master in Public Administration (MPA), Executive MBA and MPA (EMBA and EMPA), Master in Mathematics, Economics and Statistics (MMES), and Master in Development Studies (MDS) programs, ASE aims to provide the technical capacity that will enable more Africans to be hired into top management positions in development agencies and multinational corporations operating on the continent. This should foster sustainable hiring practices that will retain talent and experience in Africa.

Academic partnerships

 American University in Cairo, Egypt
 Barcelona Graduate School of Economics, Spain
 BEM Dakar – Bordeaux Management School, Senegal
 Center for Economic Research and Teaching (CIDE), (Centro de Investigación y Docencia Económicas), Mexico
 HEC Montréal, Canada
 Institut de Mathématiques et de Sciences Physiques (IMSP) at University of Abomey-Calavi (UAC), Benin
 The Julis-Rabinowitz Center for Public Policy and Finance (JRCPPF), Princeton University, USA
 Laval University, Canada
 New Economic School, Russia
 Princeton University, USA
 Toulouse School of Economics, France
 Universidad del Desarrollo, Chile
 University of Namur - FUNDP Belgium
 University of Ottawa, Canada

Media coverage
 Léonard Wantchékon: Faire preuve d’un optimisme vigilant. Afrika7, July 2016  
 Dr. Leonard Wanchekon interviewed by magazine Jeune Afrique, July 2014. 
Dr. Leonard Wantchekon presents ASE in an interview at BBC Radio, December 2013. 
ASE co-hosted a special event "Who Will Lead the African Development Bank?" with The Institute of Economic Affairs, Ghana in Accra and the Center for Global Development in Washington DC. The event, featuring seven of eight candidates, focused on key issues regarding the future of the institution.

See also

 Education in Benin
 List of universities in Benin

References

 L’African School of Economics: un projet d’excellence L'Afrique des idees
 Support for competitive politics and government performance: public perceptions of democracy in Senegal Report by ASE's professors Leonard Wantchekon and Paul-Aarons Ngomo [et al.] January 2007
 Breaking the Cycle of Rural Poverty: One Infrastructure Investment at a Time The World Bank. Africa Can End Poverty: A Blog about the Economic Challenges and Opportunities Facing Africa

External links
 , the university's official website
 Institute for Empirical Research in Political Economy

2014 establishments in Benin
Atlantique Department
Economics schools
Educational institutions established in 2014
Private universities and colleges
Universities in Benin